was a feudal domain under the Tokugawa shogunate of the Edo period, located in Kazusa Province (modern-day Chiba Prefecture), Japan. It was centered on Tsurumaki jin'ya in what is now the city of Ichihara, Chiba. It was ruled for the entirety of its history by a branch of the Mizuno clan. The name of “Tsurumaki” came from the Mizuno kamiyashiki in Edo, which was located in Wadeda-Tsurumaki-cho.

History
Tsurumaki Domain was created on May 19, 1827, when Mizuno Tadateru, the daimyō of Hōjō Domain in Awa Province relocated his jin'ya from Awa to Kazusa. As he was entitled by his status to have a castle, rather than a fortified residence, his jin'ya was called "Tsurumaki Castle". He died the following year, and his adopted son, Mizuno Tadamitsu, also served as a wakadoshiyori in the shōguns court in Edo. Tadamitsu's son Mizuno Tadayori fought on the shogunal side in the Boshin War of the Meiji Restoration, attacking his pro-imperial neighbors. As a result, he was forced to give up most of his holdings scattered around Awa and Kazusa provinces in exchange for new lands in 1869. However, he was pardoned by the new Meiji government the following year, becoming domainal governor until the abolition of the han system in 1871. He was subsequently made a viscount (shishaku) in the kazoku peerage, and the former Tsumaki Domain absorbed into the short-lived Kisarazu Prefecture before becoming part of modern Chiba Prefecture.

The domain had a population of 20,586 people in 4757 households per an 1869 census.

Holdings at the end of the Edo period
As with most domains in the han system, Tsurumaki Domain consisted of several discontinuous territories calculated to provide the assigned kokudaka, based on periodic cadastral surveys and projected agricultural yields. 
Kazusa Province
1 village in Moda District
12 villages in Ichihara District
 1 village in Isumi District 
1 village in Kamihabu District 
31 villages in Nagara District
11 villages in Yamabe District 
Awa Province
 5 villages in Nagasa District 
 1 village in Asai District

List of daimyō
  Mizuno clan (fudai) 1827–1871

References

Bolitho, Harold. (1974). Treasures among men; the fudai daimyo in Tokugawa Japan. New Haven: Yale University Press.
Kodama Kōta 児玉幸多, Kitajima Masamoto 北島正元 (1966). Kantō no shohan 関東の諸藩. Tokyo: Shin Jinbutsu Ōraisha.

External links
Genealogy of the lords of Tsurumaki

Notes

Domains of Japan
1827 establishments in Japan
States and territories established in 1827
1871 disestablishments in Japan
States and territories disestablished in 1871
Kazusa Province
History of Chiba Prefecture